Patricia del Carmen George (born 18 December 1996) is an American-born Nigerian footballer who plays as a forward for Turkish Women's Football Super League club Fenerbahçe SK and the Nigeria women's national team.

Early life
George was raised in Chicago, Illinois.

Club career

High school and college
George has attended the Von Steuben Metropolitan High School in Chicago and the University of Illinois at Urbana–Champaign.

In Germany
George has played for BV Cloppenburg and SC Sand in Germany.

International career
Through birth and descent, George is eligible to play for the United States, Venezuela or Nigeria. She made her senior debut for the latter on 18 February 2021 as a second-half substitution against Russian club CSKA Moscow at that year edition of the Turkish Women's Cup. Her first appearance facing other national team was two days later against Uzbekistan.

References

1996 births
Living people
Citizens of Nigeria through descent
Nigerian women's footballers
Women's association football forwards
BV Cloppenburg (women) players
SC Sand players
Fenerbahçe S.K. women's football players
2. Frauen-Bundesliga players
Frauen-Bundesliga players
Nigeria women's international footballers
Nigerian people of Venezuelan descent
Nigerian expatriate women's footballers
Nigerian expatriate sportspeople in Germany
Nigerian expatriate sportspeople in Turkey
Expatriate women's footballers in Turkey
Soccer players from Chicago
American women's soccer players
Illinois Fighting Illini women's soccer players
African-American women's soccer players
American sportspeople of Nigerian descent
American sportspeople of Venezuelan descent
American expatriate women's soccer players
American expatriate soccer players in Germany
American expatriate sportspeople in Turkey
21st-century African-American sportspeople
21st-century African-American women